Felix Budwell Stump (December 15, 1894 – June 13, 1972) was an admiral in the United States Navy and Commander, United States Pacific Fleet from July 10, 1953 until July 31, 1958.

Early life and career
Stump was born in Parkersburg, West Virginia, spent his early life there and was appointed to the United States Naval Academy in 1913. He served in the gunboat  and as navigator aboard the cruiser  during World War I in the Atlantic. After the war he served in the pre-dreadnought battleship . Shortly thereafter Stump attended flight training at the Naval Air Station Pensacola in 1920-1921 followed by postgraduate instruction in Aeronautical Engineering at the Massachusetts Institute of Technology. From 1923 to 1925 he was a Naval Flight Officer in Torpedo Squadron 2 (VT-2) "Doer Birds" of the experimental carrier . He commanded the Cruiser Scouting Wing in 1928-1929 and served on the Staff of Commander Cruisers, Scouting Fleet in 1930–1931. Stump was commanding officer of s Scout-Bombing Squadron 2 (VSB-2) in 1936–1937.

World War II
At the outbreak of World War II, Stump was Commanding Officer of Langley in Manila Bay, Philippines.  In January 1942 he was transferred to the Staff of the Commander in Chief, Asiatic Fleet for which he was awarded the U.S. Army's Distinguished Service Medal.

Stump was the first captain of the  following her commission in 1943.

In 1944 Stump was promoted to Rear Admiral and took command of Task Unit 52.11.2 and Carrier Division 24 embarked on the escort carrier  for operations against Saipan.

Following action at Saipan, Stump retained commanded Carrier Division 24 but was now assigned to Task Unit 77.4.2 (Taffy II). For his role in these battles he was awarded the Navy Cross. His flag remained on Natoma Bay through early 1945 while his sailors continued operations in the Philippines.

In May 1945 he served as Chief of Naval Air Technical Training Command and kept that post until December 1948.

Post-war
From December 1948 to 1951 Stump served as commander of Naval Air Forces Atlantic Fleet, during which time he was promoted to vice admiral.  From March 1951 until June 1953, Stump served as Commander, United States Second Fleet.

From July 10, 1953 to January 14, 1958, now promoted to full Admiral, he served as Commander US Pacific Command until his retirement, effective August 1, 1958.  After his retirement, he was appointed to the position of Vice Chairman of Directors and Chief Executive Officer of Freedoms Foundation at Valley Forge, Pennsylvania.

Stump died of cancer at Bethesda Naval Hospital in 1972. The   was named in his honor.

Decorations

Gallery

References

Further reading

External links
 

	

1894 births
1972 deaths
People from Parkersburg, West Virginia
United States Navy personnel of World War I
Burials at Arlington National Cemetery
United States Navy World War II admirals
United States Naval Academy alumni
United States Navy admirals
Recipients of the Navy Cross (United States)
Recipients of the Legion of Merit